Shiv Kumar Subramaniam (23 December 1959 – 10 April 2022) was an Indian actor and screenwriter who is known for his role as the leading industrial tycoon I. M. Virani in the Indian television serial Mukti Bandhan on Colors channel. He is credited with writing the screenplay for the 1989 film Parinda, directed by Vidhu Vinod Chopra and for the 2005 film Hazaaron Khwaishein Aisi, directed by Sudhir Mishra. He also appeared in supporting roles in both films. He died from an illness on 10 April 2022.

Filmography

As actor 

Meenakshi Sundareshwar (2021) as Thatha
Nail Polish (2021) as Dr. Nandi
The Accidental Prime Minister (2019) as P. Chidambaram
Tu Hai Mera Sunday as Appa
Laakhon Mein Ek as Mr. Morthy
Hichki (2018) as Principal of St.Notker's
Rocky Handsome (2016) as ACP Rebbelo
Bangistan (2015) as The Shankaracharya
Ungli as DCP Shivraman (2014)
Rahasya (2015) as Mr. Noorani
Happy Journey as Andrew (Alice's Father) (2014)
2 States as Ananya's father (2014)
24 as Kamaljit Sood
Pradhanmantri (TV Series) as K. Kamaraj
Mukti Bandhan (television serial) (2011)
That Girl in Yellow Boots (2011) as Peter
Stanley Ka Dabba (2011)
Kismat (TV series) (2011)
Teen Patti (2010) as Mr. Bose
Kaminey (2009) as Lobo
Risk (2007) as DCP Uttam Bhandari
Ek Din 24 Ghante (2003)
Dead End (2000)
Snip!  (2000)
Bombay Boys (1999)
Rakshak (1996)
Droh Kaal (1995)
1942: A Love Story (1994)
Prahaar (1994)
Parinda (1989)
.

As screenwriter 
Teen Patti (story, screenplay & dialogue) (2010)
Hazaaron Khwaishein Aisi (original story & screenplay with Sudhir Mishra & Ruchi Narain) (2005)
Chameli (screenplay) (2003)
Dead End (TV movie) (dialogue) (2000)
Arjun Pandit (screenplay) (1999)
Is Raat Ki Subah Nahin (screenplay) (1996)
1942: A Love Story (story & screenplay) (1994)
Parinda (screenplay) (1989)

As assistant director 
Parinda (1989)

Awards 
Filmfare Awards
Filmfare Award for Best Story  for Hazaaron Khwaishein Aisi (2006) shared with Sudhir Mishra & Ruchi Narain
Filmfare Award for Best Screenplay for Parinda (1990)

References

External links
 

1959 births
2022 deaths
Indian male television actors
Indian male screenwriters
Male actors in Hindi cinema